Gorakanage Ruwin Prasantha Peiris (born 9 August 1970) is a Sri Lankan first-class cricketer who plays in the Premier Trophy.

A left-handed batsman, Peiris has made over 6000 runs in Sri Lankan domestic cricket with 10 hundreds. He played with Tamil Union Cricket and Athletic Club from 1992 to 2001/02 before joining Moors Sports Club.

External links
 

1970 births
Living people
Moors Sports Club cricketers
Tamil Union Cricket and Athletic Club cricketers
Sri Lankan cricketers